James Edward Charles Carr (19 December 1893 – 26 June 1980) was a Scottish footballer who played at outside left for Reading and Southampton in the 1920s. He was also a bowls player who competed for England at the Commonwealth Games.

Football career
Carr was born in Maryhill, Glasgow, but started his football career as a youth playing for Watford Orient, before joining Watford as a 14-year-old in 1908. He made his Southern League debut for Watford at the age of 16. He moved to fellow Southern League club, West Ham United, in 1914 and made nine appearances in the 1914–15 season.

During World War I he was enlisted into the Army and played as a guest for Portsmouth and Kilmarnock in the wartime leagues. After the cessation of hostilities, Carr joined Reading in 1919, where he formed an "exciting partnership" on the left with Len Andrews. At the end of the 1919–20 season Reading, along with most of the Southern League clubs, formed the Third Division of the Football League. Carr remained with Reading for four years until moving to Southampton in June 1923.

At The Dell, Carr and Andrews briefly re-created their left-wing partnership, before Andrews was replaced by Cliff Price in December 1923. Having played in every match from the start of the 1923–24 season, a serious knee injury in January, which required an operation, put Carr out for the rest of the season, with Elias MacDonald replacing him.

Carr returned for the start of the next season, but his season was again disrupted by injuries, with either Fred Price, (Cliff Price's nephew) or Stan Cribb replacing him. Carr did, however, play a significant part in the Saints' run to the FA Cup Semi-finals, where they were defeated 2–0 by Sheffield United at Stamford Bridge.

In the 1925–26 season, Carr linked up well on the left, firstly with Cliff Price and later with Frank Matthews, before he was released at the end of the season.

Now in his mid-thirties, Carr placed an advertisement in the "Athletic News" stating that he wished to "assist a club outside the League in exchange for a business". This resulted initially in a transfer to Swansea Town where he played briefly before moving to Southall to become the proprietor of the Red Lion Hotel.

Bowls career
He participated in the 1954 British Empire and Commonwealth Games at Vancouver, British Columbia, Canada in the fours/rinks event finishing 8th.

References

External links
West Ham United profile

1893 births
1980 deaths
Footballers from Glasgow
Scottish footballers
Southern Football League players
English Football League players
Watford F.C. players
West Ham United F.C. players
Reading F.C. players
Southampton F.C. players
Swansea City A.F.C. players
Queens Park Rangers F.C. players
British Army personnel of World War I
Southall F.C. players
Association football outside forwards
Scottish male bowls players
English male bowls players
Bowls players at the 1954 British Empire and Commonwealth Games
Commonwealth Games competitors for England